The 1910–11 season was Stoke's third and final season in the Birmingham & District League and second in the Southern Football League.

Stoke again played in two league competitions in 1910–11 and were very successful in both. They won the Birmingham & District League and also gained promotion to the Southern Football League Division One after finishing runner-up to Reading on goal average.

Season review

League
Progress was being made slowly, and the directors were able to spend money on new players to strengthen the squad, whilst at the same time the club decided to remain in two league competitions. One major acquisition in the summer of 1910 was forward Jack Peart from Sheffield United. He made a brilliant impact, scoring 31 goals in just 21 matches before breaking his leg against Crewe Alexandra in December 1910. Stoke also re-signed goalkeeper Arthur Cartlidge for £315 a lot of money for a 'keeper in 1910 as Stoke's finances began to improve.

Stoke played 59 competitive fixtures in 1910–11. They won the Birmingham & District League and gained promotion from the Southern Football League Division Two as runners-up. A total of 167 goals were scored in the 56 league matches with the two Smiths Alf and William scoring 58 between them. They were numerous high-scoring victories including a 10–0 win over Halesowen Town, an 8–0 away win at Chesham Town and an 8–1 home win over Kettering Town. Stoke also hit six on five occasions.

With Stoke now in a tougher competition the directors decided that Stoke should leave their reserve side to play in the Birmingham & District League and let their first team concentrate on the Southern League.

FA Cup
After fine qualifying round wins over Worcester City (7–0) and Lincoln City (4–0), Stoke lost 2–1 in the first round to Manchester City.

Final league table

Birmingham & District League

Southern Football League Division Two

Results

Stoke's score comes first

Legend

Birmingham & District League

Southern Football League Division Two

FA Cup

Squad statistics

References

Stoke City F.C. seasons
Stoke